Diego León Ayarza (born 16 January 1984) is a Spanish footballer who plays as a midfielder .

Club career

Real Madrid / Grasshoppers
León was born in Palencia, Castile and León. A youth product of Real Madrid, León could never appear for more than its B-team. He was initially given a number with the main squad for the 2004–05 season, but moved to Arminia Bielefeld in Germany (first on loan) in January 2005 before he could make his official debut for the Spanish giants.

León stayed at Arminia until the end of the 2005–06 campaign, after which he joined Grasshopper Club Zürich in the Swiss Super League.

Barnsley
On 21 December 2007, it was announced that León had signed a pre-contract agreement with Barnsley, with the transfer due to go through at the opening of the transfer window. The Yorkshire club had hoped to make the move official in time for him to play in the FA Cup third-round tie against Blackpool on 5 January 2008, but had to wait until the 9th: he made his first appearance that evening, playing in a reserve team match against Sheffield United.

León put in a great performance to earn himself his first match ball as a Barnsley player, with a Man of the match award against Colchester United on 29 January 2008. He went on to play in the memorable away victory over Premier League's Liverpool in the FA Cup, and also played a key role in the Reds 3–0 win at Watford on 9 April, being involved in all three goals, including a sumptuous flick for Jon Macken to square to Kayode Odejayi to score: his corner allowed Stephen Foster to head home and his throughball enabled Odejayi to score his second.

In the following game against Preston North End, León netted a key goal in Barnsley's Championship survival in the 2007–08 campaign, scoring from a 35-yard free kick for the 2–1 triumph. His second and final goal for the Tykes came in a 3–2 win over Burnley on 24 November 2008 and, on 7 May of the following year, he was told, along with Dennis Souza, Kyle Letheren and Marciano van Homoet he was free to look for a new club in the summer; shortly after he returned to his country, agreeing a deal with Segunda División side UD Las Palmas.

Later years
On 13 December 2010, León moved teams – and countries – again, signing with lowly SV Wacker Burghausen in Germany. In June of the following year, after a failed move to HNK Hajduk Split, he joined Nea Salamis Famagusta FC in Cyprus.

Club statistics

Honours
Spain U16
UEFA European Under-16 Championship: 2001

References

External links

 

1984 births
Living people
People from Palencia
Sportspeople from the Province of Palencia
Spanish footballers
Footballers from Castile and León
Association football midfielders
Segunda División players
Segunda División B players
Real Madrid Castilla footballers
Real Madrid CF players
UD Las Palmas players
Bundesliga players
3. Liga players
Arminia Bielefeld players
SV Wacker Burghausen players
Swiss Super League players
Grasshopper Club Zürich players
English Football League players
Barnsley F.C. players
Cypriot First Division players
Nea Salamis Famagusta FC players
Doxa Katokopias FC players
Super League Greece players
Football League (Greece) players
A.O. Kerkyra players
Olympiacos Volos F.C. players
Mesaimeer SC players
Spain youth international footballers
Spanish expatriate footballers
Expatriate footballers in Germany
Expatriate footballers in Switzerland
Expatriate footballers in England
Expatriate footballers in Cyprus
Expatriate footballers in Greece
Expatriate footballers in Qatar
Spanish expatriate sportspeople in Germany
Spanish expatriate sportspeople in England
Spanish expatriate sportspeople in Cyprus
Spanish expatriate sportspeople in Greece
Spanish expatriate sportspeople in Switzerland
Qatari Second Division players